The World Junior Curling Championships are an annual curling bonspiel featuring the world's best curlers who are 21 years old or younger. The competitions for both men and women occur at the same venue. The men's tournament has occurred since 1975 and the women's since 1988. Since curling became an Olympic sport in 1998, the World Junior Curling Championship of the year preceding the Olympic Games have been held at the site of the curling tournament for the upcoming Games.

The event has its origins in the International Junior Masters Bonspiel which began in 1968 and was held annually at the East York Curling Club. By 1973, the tournament began being called the International Junior Curling Championship and the World Junior Curling Championship in 1974, before being officially sanctioned in 1975.

Qualification
Teams qualify to participate in the World Junior Curling Championships through final rankings at the previous year's championships or through the World Junior B Curling Championships, which includes any teams that did not already qualify for the championships via the previous year's rankings. The top three teams of this tournament qualify for the main tournament, and the bottom three teams from the main tournament are then demoted to the B tournament. This type of tournament also existed from 2001 to 2004, where two teams were awarded qualification spots through the B tournament instead of three.

Previously, teams that did not qualify through rankings qualified through regional qualifiers. In the Europe Zone, teams participated in the European Junior Curling Challenge, in which the winner advances to the World Championships. In the Pacific Zone, teams participated in the Pacific-Asia Junior Curling Championships, in which the winner advances to the World Championships.

Summary

Men's
Skips listed below nation.

Women's

All-time Medal Tables
As of 2023

Men 

Women

Overall

References

 
Youth curling
Curling
junior